Sternohammus is a genus of longhorn beetles of the subfamily Lamiinae, containing the following species:

 Sternohammus assamensis Breuning, 1966
 Sternohammus atricornis Breuning, 1935
 Sternohammus celebensis Breuning, 1935
 Sternohammus femoralis (Aurivillius, 1927)
 Sternohammus femoraloides Breuning, 1980
 Sternohammus laosensis Breuning, 1963
 Sternohammus niasensis Breuning, 1935
 Sternohammus sericeus (Breuning, 1938)
 Sternohammus strandi Breuning, 1935
 Sternohammus sumatranus Breuning, 1935
 Sternohammus yunnanus Wang & Jiang, 1998

References

Lamiini